Adam James Wharton (born 2 June 2004) is an English professional footballer who plays as a midfielder for Blackburn Rovers.

Club career
In May 2022, Wharton signed his first professional contract at Blackburn Rovers, a two-and-a-half year deal with an option through to 2025.

On 10 August 2022, Wharton made his professional debut after being named in the starting XI for a 4–0 EFL Cup first round victory at Ewood Park against Hartlepool United.

On 27 August 2022, Wharton made his league debut against Stoke City coming off the bench at half time for Joe Rankin-Costello. On 31 August 2022, Wharton made his full 90 minutes league debut against Blackpool, winning Player of the Match for an outstanding performance. On 22 October 2022, Wharton scored his first goal for the club during a victory over Birmingham City.

International career
On 16 September 2022, Wharton along with Blackburn teammate Ashley Phillips were called up to the England U19 squad. Wharton made his debut in a 2–0 win against Montenegro U19.

Personal life
Adam is the younger brother of Scott Wharton, also a professional footballer.

Career statistics

References

External links

2004 births
Living people
People from Blackburn
English footballers
Association football midfielders
Blackburn Rovers F.C. players
England youth international footballers